Robert Ndip Tambe (born 22 February 1994) is a Cameroonian professional footballer who plays as a forward.

Club career
Tambe is from the English-speaking part of Cameroon and started his career there as well, at Njala Quan Sports Academy in Limbe.

Spartak Trnava
In January 2016, Tambe signed a two-year contract with the Slovak side Spartak Trnava. He made his professional debut for  Trnava against Michalovce on 27 February 2016.

Adana Demirspor
On 31 July 2017, Tambe joined Turkish club Adana Demirspor.

CFR Cluj & Sheriff Tiraspol loan
On 4 July 2018, it was announced that Tambe signed a deal with Romanian defending champions CFR Cluj. He scored two goals in ten appearances all competitions comprised in the first half of the season, before agreeing to a year-long loan with Moldovan side Sheriff Tiraspol on 24 January 2019. On 30 January 2020, Tambe was released by CFR Cluj.

Shaanxi Chang'an Athletic
On 29 February 2020, Timbe joined China League One side Shaanxi Chang'an Athletic.

International career
Tambe made his senior debut for the Cameroon national football team in a 2–0 win over The Gambia for 2017 Africa Cup of Nations qualification.

Career statistics

Honours

Club
CFR Cluj
Liga I: 2018–19
Supercupa României: 2018

International
Cameroon
Africa Cup of Nations: 2017

References

External links
Spartak Trnava official profile 
Robert Ndip Tambe at Futbalnet.sk 

1994 births
Living people
People from Buea
Cameroonian footballers
Association football forwards
LZS Piotrówka players
Slovak Super Liga players
FC Spartak Trnava players
TFF First League players
Adana Demirspor footballers
Liga I players
CFR Cluj players
Moldovan Super Liga players
FC Sheriff Tiraspol players
Cameroon international footballers
2017 Africa Cup of Nations players
2017 FIFA Confederations Cup players
Cameroonian expatriate footballers
Expatriate footballers in Poland
Cameroonian expatriate sportspeople in Poland
Expatriate footballers in Slovakia
Cameroonian expatriate sportspeople in Slovakia
Expatriate footballers in Turkey
Cameroonian expatriate sportspeople in Turkey
Expatriate footballers in Romania
Cameroonian expatriate sportspeople in Romania
Expatriate footballers in Moldova
Cameroonian expatriate sportspeople in Moldova